.sgm may refer to the following file formats:

 Standard Generalized Markup Language
 Encoded Archival Description Document, an XML standard for encoding archival finding aids, maintained by the Library of Congress and the Society of American Archivists
 SoftQuad XMetaL File, for the SoftQuad Software XMetaL
 Visual Boy Advance Saved State File, VisualBoyAdvance